In five-dimensional geometry, a truncated 5-simplex is a convex uniform 5-polytope, being a truncation of the regular 5-simplex.

There are unique 2 degrees of truncation. Vertices of the truncation 5-simplex are located as pairs on the edge of the 5-simplex. Vertices of the bitruncation 5-simplex are located on the triangular faces of the 5-simplex.

Truncated 5-simplex 

The truncated 5-simplex has 30 vertices, 75 edges, 80 triangular faces, 45 cells (15 tetrahedral, and 30 truncated tetrahedron), and 12 4-faces (6 5-cell and 6 truncated 5-cells).

Alternate names 
 Truncated hexateron (Acronym: tix) (Jonathan Bowers)

Coordinates 
The vertices of the truncated 5-simplex can be most simply constructed on a hyperplane in 6-space as permutations of (0,0,0,0,1,2) or of (0,1,2,2,2,2). These coordinates come from facets of the truncated 6-orthoplex and bitruncated 6-cube respectively.

Images

Bitruncated 5-simplex

Alternate names 
 Bitruncated hexateron (Acronym: bittix) (Jonathan Bowers)

Coordinates 
The vertices of the bitruncated 5-simplex can be most simply constructed on a hyperplane in 6-space as permutations of (0,0,0,1,2,2) or of (0,0,1,2,2,2). These represent positive orthant facets of the bitruncated 6-orthoplex, and the tritruncated 6-cube respectively.

Images

Related uniform 5-polytopes 
The truncated 5-simplex is one of 19 uniform 5-polytopes based on the [3,3,3,3] Coxeter group, all shown here in A5 Coxeter plane orthographic projections. (Vertices are colored by projection overlap order, red, orange, yellow, green, cyan, blue, purple having progressively more vertices)

Notes

References 
 H.S.M. Coxeter: 
 H.S.M. Coxeter, Regular Polytopes, 3rd Edition, Dover New York, 1973 
 Kaleidoscopes: Selected Writings of H.S.M. Coxeter, edited by F. Arthur Sherk, Peter McMullen, Anthony C. Thompson, Asia Ivic Weiss, Wiley-Interscience Publication, 1995,  
 (Paper 22) H.S.M. Coxeter, Regular and Semi Regular Polytopes I, [Math. Zeit. 46 (1940) 380-407, MR 2,10]
 (Paper 23) H.S.M. Coxeter, Regular and Semi-Regular Polytopes II, [Math. Zeit. 188 (1985) 559-591]
 (Paper 24) H.S.M. Coxeter, Regular and Semi-Regular Polytopes III, [Math. Zeit. 200 (1988) 3-45]
 Norman Johnson Uniform Polytopes, Manuscript (1991)
 N.W. Johnson: The Theory of Uniform Polytopes and Honeycombs, Ph.D. 
  x3x3o3o3o - tix, o3x3x3o3o - bittix

External links 
 
 Polytopes of Various Dimensions, Jonathan Bowers
 Truncated uniform polytera (tix), Jonathan Bowers
 Multi-dimensional Glossary

5-polytopes